Koninklijke Sporting Club Lokeren Temse often simply called Lokeren-Temse or Lokeren) is a Belgian professional football club based in the city of Lokeren, in the province of East Flanders. The club was originally founded in 1945 as KSV Temse in the neighbouring town of Temse but following the bankruptcy of K.S.C. Lokeren Oost-Vlaanderen in 2020 both clubs merged to form K.S.C. Lokeren-Temse.

History

Temse
Prior to the second world war, Temse had two official football clubs: Racing Temsche (matricule 807), founded in 1908 and playing in blue and yellow later renamed into FC Temsica; and Temsche SK (matricule 501), founded in 1924 and playing in red and white. The latter club was most successful, playing six seasons in the third division in the 1930s.

In 1945, both clubs merged to form a new club KSV Temse (matricule 4297), playing in blue and white and starting in the Belgian Provincial Leagues where it would remain for most of the time before starting to climb back up in the 21st century, reaching the fourth division in 2003 and the third division in 2009 before settling again at the fourth level, now renamed to Belgian Second Amateur Division.

Lokeren
Matricule 282 was given in 1920 to a club named Football Club Racing Club Lokeren (nicknamed Racing FC), but the team stopped its activity the next year. On 22 January 1923 Racing Club Lokeren was founded. Between 1945 and 1951, it had a slight name change (to Racing Athletiek- en Football Club Lokeren) and the new name since 1951 was Koninklijke Racing Club Lokeren. Due to financial problems, the fusion with the other team from the town (Koninklijke Standaard FC Lokeren) became necessary in 1970, with the new club was then named Koninklijke Sporting Club Lokeren, abbreviated to KSC Lokeren. In the late 1970s and early 1980s, the club participated several times in the UEFA Cup, most notably reaching the quarter-finals in 1981. That year, the club also became runner-up in the league and reached the cup final, losing to Standard Liège. Thereafter the club was less successful but remained at the highest level of Belgian football (except for three seasons in the mid 1990s), mostly finishing mid-table with the best result a third place in 2003. In 2000, the club merged again, now with Koninklijke Sint-Niklaas SKE to form Sporting Lokeren Sint-Niklaas Waasland. The latest name change occurred in 2003, with the province name (Oost-Vlaanderen) added to the club name, to become K.S.C. Lokeren Oost-Vlaanderen''

In 2012 and 2014, Lokeren twice managed to win the Belgian Cup, the second time also followed by a successful campaign in the UEFA Europa League, most notably eliminating Hull City to reach the group stage. In 2019, Lokeren were relegated to the First Division B, the second tier of Belgian football for the first time in nearly 25 years. Later that year, the club was taken over by a group led by Louis de Vries and Alexander Janssen, taking the positions of president and CEO respectively. In April 2020, the club was declared bankrupt during the 2019–20 season. Lokeren had outstanding debts of €5 million and was not able to pay its staff and players anymore, folded as a club and ceased to exist. A few days after the bankruptcy, the club agreed to merge with KSV Temse to form a new club named K.S.V. Lokeren-Temse''' which will play in the Belgian Second Amateur Division, the national fourth level. The club continues under the matricule of Temse but relocated to the stadium of Lokeren.

Current squad

References

External links
 Official website 

Association football clubs established in 1945
Football clubs in Belgium
1945 establishments in Belgium
Sport in East Flanders
Lokeren